Francis I or Francis the First may refer to:

 Francesco I Gonzaga (1366–1407)
 Francis I, Duke of Brittany (1414–1450), reigned 1442–1450
 Francis I of France (1494–1547), reigned 1515–1547
 Francis I, Duke of Saxe-Lauenburg (1510–1581), reigned 1543–1571
 Francis I, Duke of Nevers (1516–1561), reigned 1539–1561
 Francis I, Duke of Lorraine (1517–1545), reigned 1544–1545
 Francesco I de' Medici, Grand Duke of Tuscany (1541–1587), reigned 1574–1587
 Francis I of Beauharnais  (died 1587), leading noble of the French House of Beauharnais
 Francesco I d'Este, Duke of Modena (1610–1658), reigned 1644–1658
 Francis I, Holy Roman Emperor (1708–1765), reigned 1745–1765
 Francis I (Erbach-Erbach) (1754–1823), Count of Erbach
 Francis I of the Two Sicilies (1777–1830), reigned 1825–1830
 Francis II, Holy Roman Emperor, also known as Francis I, Emperor of Austria, (1768–1835), reigned 1804–1835
 Franz I, Prince of Liechtenstein (1853–1938)
 Pope Francis (born 1936), leader of the Catholic Church since 2013
 Francis the First (play), an 1832 play by Fanny Kemble
 Francis the First, an opera composed by Edward Loder

See also 
 Francesco I (disambiguation)
 Francisco I. Madero (1873–1913), Mexican revolutionary, writer and statesman; 37th president of Mexico